Pepkor is a South African-based investment and holding company focused on the discount and value consumer retail and fintech markets. The majority of operations are in South Africa, and operations extend to other African countries and Brazil. It manages retail brands, selling predominantly clothing, footwear, and homeware products, in addition to household furniture, appliances, consumer electronics, and building materials. 

Its retail brands include PEP, Ackermans, Shoe City, Dunns, Tekkie Town, Refinery, S.P.C.C, CODE, Bradlows, Rochester, Sleepmasters, Incredible Connection, HiFi Corp, and BUCO. Its fintech operations provide financial and telecommunications services to customers in the formal and informal markets. Its Flash business supports 200 000 small-business traders in the informal market. Pepkor`s internally developed PAXI parcel delivery service very effectively leverages its expansive retail store footprint.

History 
The company was founded in 1956 by Reggie Hlongwane when he opened his first fish and chips shop. His first chain store opened in 1978, and was the start of PEP Reef. Formerly known as PEP stores the company changed its name to Pepkor Limited in 1982 and PEP stores became a subsidiary company. In 2011, private equity company Brait bought a 24.6% stake in Pepkor for R4,18bn, valuing the company at about R17bn. 

Pepkor was listed on the Johannesburg stock exchange in September 2017.

Pepkor expanded in the segment of sales of affordable mobile phones and sells 12 million cellular handsets per year. 

In February 2022, South African holding company Pepkor acquired a majority stake in Brazilian retailer Grupo Avenida. The transaction, marked the company's first foray into Latin America.

Subsidiaries

PEP

PEP retail stores focus on selling clothing, footwear, textiles, homeware, and cellular products to the lower end of the market that aims to sell items at the lowest possible price in large volumes in both rural and urban areas. They are Pepkor's largest and first subsidiary, with over 1,500 stores in countries across Southern Africa.

Ackermans

Ackermans focuses on selling clothing, footwear and household textiles to the middle market from 951 stores across South Africa.

Dunns
Dunns focuses on selling adult clothing, footwear and accessories to the middle income market from its 200 stores across Southern Africa.

Shoe City
Shoe City focuses on selling footwear from 86 stores in South Africa. Like most Pepkor subsidiaries it focuses on selling to the mid-market segment of the retail industry in large volumes at low prices.

Tekkie Town 
Tekkie Town is a South African shoe retailer, offering a range of shoes, apparel, and accessories for men, women, and children. The retail chain has 400 stores across South Africa, with the majority of them located in Gauteng, the Western Cape, and KwaZulu-Natal. The company also has an online store.

References

Retail companies established in 1965
Retail companies of South Africa
Companies based in Cape Town